The 2001 Oklahoma State Cowboys football team represented Oklahoma State University in the 2001 NCAA Division I-A football season. Les Miles was in his first season at Oklahoma State as head coach. In the three years prior to Miles' arrival in Stillwater, the Cowboys finished 5–6, 5–6, and 3–8. Oklahoma State posted another losing record (4–7) in Miles' first season at the helm.

The final game of the season was a game to remember for the Cowboys.  The Cowboys, amidst a losing season, went to Norman, Oklahoma to battle their state rivals, the Oklahoma Sooners. The Sooners had a possible National Championship on the line.  The Cowboys won the game with a late catch by TD Bryant on third down and seven from the Oklahoma State 45 yard line. The catch went for 31 yards and set up the game-winning catch.  Rashaun Woods then caught a touchdown pass from Josh Fields in the left corner of the end zone, giving the Cowboys the win.

Schedule

Game summaries

Oklahoma

    
    
    
    
    
    
    

Rashaun Woods 8 Rec, 129 Yds

Team players drafted in the NFL and NRL (National Rugby League)
No one from the Cowboys was selected in the 2002 NFL Draft. Kevin Williams would be selected 9th overall in the 2003 NFL Draft. Cowboys Rashaun Woods (31st overall), Tatum Bell (41st overall), and Antonio Smith (135th overall) would be selected in the 2004 NFL Draft.
Linebacker Dwayne Levels was not selected in an NFL Draft, but he played one season in the league.
Darrent Williams, a true freshman starter at cornerback, would be drafted in the second round (56th overall) of the 2005 NFL Draft.
Billy Bajema, a freshman tight end, would be drafted in 2005 by the Wests Tigers of the National Rugby League, where he played for 3 seasons 2005 NFL Draft.

Awards and honors

References

Oklahoma State
Oklahoma State Cowboys football seasons
Oklahoma State Cowboys football